Wilhelmine Dorothee von der Marwitz (April 1718 – 16 January 1787), was the royal mistress of Frederick, Margrave of Brandenburg-Bayreuth, from the late 1730s until 1744. She was also the host of an influential salon in Vienna in the 1780s.

Life
She was the daughter of the Prussian noble knight Heinrich Karl von der Marwitz, governor of Breslau, and Albertine Eleonore von Wittenhorst (1693-1721). She was employed at the court of Prussia as maid of honour to Wilhelmine of Prussia, Margravine of Brandenburg-Bayreuth, and followed the princess to Baureuth upon the princess' marriage in 1731. In 1730s, Frederick, Margrave of Brandenburg-Bayreuth, made her his official favorite: is regarded likely that he abused his position and that Wilhelmine Dorothee did not become his mistress voluntarily.
In 1744, Wilhelmine arranged her to marry the Austrian count Otto Ludwig Conrad von Burghauß (1713-1795), which required her to leave Baureuth and settle in Austria, thereby ending her position as favorite. She lived in Budapest and Trieste with her spouse. In 1780, she moved to Vienna, where she hosted an influential and famed literary salon, frequented by Georg Forster, Henry Swinburne, Graf Karl von Zinzendorf and Wenzel Anton von Kaunitz: she supported the Josephine reforms and acted as benefactor of Benjamin Thompson and Johann Hunczowski.

References

 Karl Graf von Zinzendorf: Wien von Maria Theresia bis zur Franzosenzeit: aus den Tagebüchern des Grafen Karl von Zinzendorf. Wiener Bibliophilen Ges., 1972, S. 167.

Mistresses of German royalty
1718 births
1787 deaths
Austrian salon-holders
Wilhelmine Dorothee